Elections to Gosport Council were held on 10 June 2004.  Half of the council was up for election, and the council stayed under no overall control.

After the election, the composition of the council was
Conservative: 15
Labour: 11
Liberal Democrat: 5
Others: 3

Election result

Ward results

Alverstoke

Anglesey

Bridgemary North

Bridgemary South

Brockhurst

Christchurch

Elson

Forton

Grange

Hardway

Lee East

Lee West

Leesland

Peel Common

Privett

Rowner & Holbrook

Town

References
2004 Gosport election result
Ward results

2004
2004 English local elections
2000s in Hampshire